Siegfried's Dale Farm, also known as the Rodale Research Center or Rodale Institute, is a historic home and farm complex located in Maxatawny Township, Pennsylvania. The property includes 13 contributing buildings and a contributing structure and three houses built between 1790 and 1827, the John and Catherina Siegfried Bank barn (1819, 1905), calving barn (c. 1900), two small barns (c. 1860 and c. 1900), corn crib, Henry Siegfried Bank barn (mid-19th century), spring and rendering house (c. 1790 and c. 1880), one-story brick school house (1906), smokehouse (c. 1820), and carriage house (c. 1880).  The John and Catherina Siegfried house (1790) is a -story, four-bay, rubble stone house with a slate gable roof.  The Henry Siegfried house (1827) is a -story, five-bay, rubble stone house in the Georgian style. The Johannes Siegfried house (1790) is a -story, four-bay, sided rubble stone dwelling with a three-bay Victorian porch. 

Moravian settler Johannes Siegfried acquired the property in 1732.  It remained in the Siegfried family until being acquired in 1971 by The Rodale Institute.

It was listed on the National Register of Historic Places in 1984.

Gallery

References

External links
Rodale Institute website

Farms on the National Register of Historic Places in Pennsylvania
Georgian architecture in Pennsylvania
Houses completed in 1790
Houses in Berks County, Pennsylvania
National Register of Historic Places in Berks County, Pennsylvania